Kampong Jaya Setia is a village in Brunei-Muara District, Brunei, and a neighbourhood in the capital Bandar Seri Begawan. The population was 855 in 2016. It is one of the villages within Mukim Berakas 'A'. The postcode is BB2713.

References 

Neighbourhoods in Bandar Seri Begawan
Villages in Brunei-Muara District